Ora (stylised as ORA) is the debut studio album by British singer Rita Ora. It was released on 24 August 2012 through Roc Nation and Columbia Records. Musically, Ora is mainly a pop album that incorporates dance elements.

The album's release was preceded by two singles—"How We Do (Party)" and "R.I.P."—both of which entered the UK Singles Chart at number 1 and achieved standard chart positions in charts abroad. The album also includes the DJ Fresh collaboration, "Hot Right Now", which is featured as a bonus track. The album debuted at number 1 on the UK Albums Chart and was certified platinum by the British Phonographic Industry.

Background and development
In 2008, Ora signed to American record label, Roc Nation. She recorded an album's worth of material with a view to release it, but her label advised against it. Instead Ora began work on different songs to be included on her debut album.

For the recording of the album, Ora enlisted the help of producers such as will.i.am, The-Dream, The Runners, The Monarch, Stargate, Chase & Status, Greg Kurstin, Jules De Martino and Diplo.

Ora described the album cover as: "Everything was inspired basically by being bossy, by being independent, and by taking your own. We made sure that everything had character." She explained the title of the album: "Ora is my surname, but it also means time in my country, Kosovo, in Albanian, and it definitely took me a long time to get this album – three years to be exact." On 22 July 2012, the official deluxe version album cover was revealed.

Composition
When Ora spoke on the album she stated: "The crazy thing is I wanted the album to sound exactly like the subway, almost as if its just so free and raw." When speaking about the sound of the album and its concept, Ora said the album "definitely has pop in it, but (...) you can hear influences of jazz in there, you can hear influences of Monica and Aaliyah, and then you can hear Gwen Stefani." Ora described the sound of her album saying "I love No Doubt and Eric Clapton and Bruce Springsteen. It's old school mixed with a pop kind of stream with a grit. It's got attitude to it but it's not ignorant. It's just a cool album in my eyes."

Reception

Critical reception

Ora has received mixed reviews from music critics. At AllMusic, Fred Thomas alluded to how the album "manages to be more captivating than her peers by merit of her real approach to her songs, but sonically the album is somewhat interchangeable", but suggested that multiple listens make this release a "masterpiece of unrepentantly commercial pop". Tamsyn Wilce of Bring the Noise suggested that the singer "stick with making the brilliant pop hits as seen in the first half of the album". At Contactmusic.com, Dom Gourlay affirmed that the release "is still a worthy introduction to the world of arguably the UK's most credible and slightly left of centre pop star in years". Digital Spy's Robert Copsey stated that "the culmination of 24 months of trend watching, market positioning and image primping on the resulting Ora does, more often than not, make it feel like a highly calculated exercise, but that doesn't mean she hasn't turned out some genuinely well-crafted songs".

Holly Newins of The Digital Fix told that "is surprisingly convincing, especially with the dance hall influence that is blatant across the album", which she found that the listener will have songs that they will and will not be a fan of. Furthermore, she said because Jay-Z's involvement that "the ratio of hits to misses doesn't matter anyway", and that he will make sure Rita Ora "will be on your radio for a long time to come". Drowned in Sound's Marcus J. Moore called the album "certainly catchy, and the maker is enthralling", yet the album lacks "any intricate rhythms here and the messages aren't profound". At The Guardian, Michael Cragg found that "there's just too much anonymity". At The Independent, Andy Gill evoked that "the album does not give evidence Rita Ora is anything like Gwen Stefani, which she considers her influence, but rather a Rihanna coming from the United Kingdom". Laurence Green of musicOMH vowed that "the defining feeling here is of something completely and utterly 'produced' – a factory line-up of the biggest names and beats in contemporary pop, machine tooled into something so sleek it's in danger of slipping through the ether entirely". Scott Kara of The New Zealand Herald told that on the release "she wears her influences on her sleeve". At Time Out, Sharon O'Connell criticised the album because it contains "so little of Ora here", and suggested that "all Ora really gets to do is channel a sound now so ubiquitous it's carpet-bombed our consciousness".

Commercial performance
Ora debuted at number one on the UK Albums Chart with first-week sales of 41,509 copies. Throughout 2012, the album sold 242,500 copies, becoming the thirty-fifth best selling album of the year. In 2013, the album was certified platinum by the British Phonographic Industry.

Singles
"How We Do (Party)" was released as the album's lead single in North America, Australia and New Zealand on 20 March 2012. The single peaked at number 5 in New Zealand and at number 9 in Australia. The song also reached number 62 on the Billboard Hot 100. In August 2012, it was released as the second single in the UK, Ireland and the rest of Europe. The song reached number 1 in Ireland, becoming her first Irish number-one single. It also reached number 1 in the UK, becoming her third number one single (second as a solo artist) and making Ora the first artist in 2012 to score three number 1 singles on the UK charts.

"R.I.P.", featuring Tinie Tempah, was released as the lead single in Ireland on 4 May 2012, in the United Kingdom on 6 May 2012, and the rest of Europe. The song debuted at the top of the UK Singles Chart, becoming her first solo number-one single, and second overall. It was released as the album's second single in New Zealand, Australia and North America.

"Shine Ya Light" was officially released as the third UK single on 4 November 2012. It peaked at number ten in the UK Singles Chart, making it Ora's fourth top 10 UK single overall in 2012. It also served as a third single in Ireland, where it peaked at number 25.

"Radioactive" was released as the fourth and last single from Ora, on 11 February 2013. The song peaked at number 18 in the UK and number 23 in Australia.

Promotional singles 
"Roc the Life" was released in the United Kingdom on 23 July 2012 as a promotional single, with a music video that featured footage of Ora on her UK tour appearing in September. A music video for "Facemelt" was directed by British photographer Rankin and it was released on Hunger TV on 30 April.

Promotion

Live performances
In April, Ora sang a live acoustic version of "How We Do (Party)" on Wired 96.5 radio in Philadelphia. In April 2012, Ora performed "How We Do (Party)" and "R.I.P." live while supporting Drake on his Club Paradise Tour in the UK. Ora performed "R.I.P." live in studio for 4Music's show, The Crush, with a live band. On 23 June 2012, Ora performed at Radio 1's Big Weekend, where she sang "Facemelt", "Roc the Life", "How We Do (Party)", "Shine Ya Light" and "R.I.P." Ora performed at various British music festivals in 2012, including Wireless Festival, T in the Park 2012 and V Festival. She performed "Shine Ya Light" on The X Factor on 4 November 2012. On 18 August 2012, Ora performed at The Jonathan Ross Show.

Radioactive Tour
In January and February 2013 she embarked on a 12-date UK tour where according to The Independent, "stage-school trained Ora can rely on more traditional showbiz values to succeed" to put on a show. She worked with deceased designer Emilio Pucci on aspects of the presentation of the show.

 Ora was joined by Tinie Tempah when performing "R.I.P." in London and Manchester.
 Iggy Azalea and Draper were support acts.

Track listing

Notes
 Track listing and credits from album booklet.
  signifies an additional producer
  signifies a vocal producer
  signifies a co-producer
 "Facemelt" is originally "Brap" written and performed by Bart B More with original vocals performed by Rita Ora.
 "R.I.P." interpolates portions of "Heartbeat" written by N. Egbuna and F. Samadzada and performed by Nneka.
 "Fall in Love" interpolates portions of "Handguns (Dada Life Remix)" written by Alexis Latrobe.

Charts

Weekly charts

Year-end charts

Certifications

Release history

References

Rita Ora albums
2012 debut albums
Albums produced by Chase & Status
Albums produced by Chris Loco
Albums produced by Diplo
Albums produced by Fraser T. Smith
Albums produced by Greg Kurstin
Albums produced by Stargate
Albums produced by The-Dream
Albums produced by the Runners
Albums produced by will.i.am
Columbia Records albums
Roc Nation albums